"If I Were Your Woman" is a song recorded by American family group Gladys Knight & the Pips. It was written by Pam Sawyer, Clay McMurray, and Gloria Jones, produced by McMurray and arranged by David Van De Pitte. Released in late 1970 from the album of the same title, it spent one week at number 1 on the Best Selling Soul Singles chart in January 1971.  It was also successful on the Billboard Hot 100 singles chart, peaking at number 9.

Chart history

Later versions

Alicia Keys version 

Alicia Keys recorded a version of "If I Were Your Woman" in which she sampled the Isaac Hayes version of "Walk On By" for her second studio album The Diary of Alicia Keys (2003). Keys sampled the same loop of Hayes' song the Notorious B.I.G. sampled on his song "Warning", which was produced by Easy Mo Bee, who co-produced Keys' version. Keys would later record a full version of the song for her first live album Unplugged (2005); it received a nomination for Best Traditional R&B Vocal Performance at the 2006 Grammy Awards. Another version, entitled "If I Was Your Woman (Original Funky Demo Version)" appears on Songs in A Minor: 10th Anniversary Edition (2011). Keys stated that it was "dangerous" to record the song, and commented "when I do a remake, it's not about wondering how people will criticize it. It's a private choice". "If I Was Your Woman" was included on the set list of Keys' Diary Tour (2005).

"If I Was Your Woman" was generally well received by music critics in their reviews for The Diary of Alicia Keys. David Segal from The Washington Post commented that with the music from "Walk on By", the song is a "successful cross-breeding experiment". Mark Anthony Neal of PopMatters felt that the song was the "funkiest and most hip-hop inflected track" on the album, adding that it "forc[ed] Keys to push towards her highest vocal register". BBC Music reviewer Denise Boyd called it a "[song] to look out for" on the album. Dimitri Ehrlich of Vibe praised Keys' vocal in the song, writing "Her voice is low and full, brimming with emotion. Singing as if her life depended on every note, she makes sure you feel the urgency". Steve LaBate of Paste described the song as "a well-written soul-pop tune with a killer sitar hook and Keys’ chiming harp-like piano accents that eventually morph into sparse, pretty jazz chords during the verse" and concluded that it's one of the "stronger tracks" on the album. Jim Farber of the New York Daily News commented that Keys took a risk by covering the song, but concluded that "she makes it her own, putting more funk in the rhythm and finding new throatiness in her voice". Laura Sinagra of The Village Voice was not pleased with the song, writing that "Keys streets up Gladys Knight with "If I Was Your Woman" and might get fan points for effort, but her hip-hop "aw, aw, aw"s fail to convince".

Other recordings 
 George Michael sang the song with a small adaptation of the lyrics ('If you were my woman') during the Nelson Mandela 70th Birthday Tribute on 11 June 1988 at Wembley Stadium. In 1990, the song was released on the b-side of the Praying for Time single.
 There have been numerous other versions, most notably by Stephanie Mills. Her version peaked at number 19 on the Hot Black Singles chart in 1988.
 Some years before, Latimore on his homonymous album of 1973, recorded this song with the title "If You Were My Woman" (number 70 R&B).
 On November 4, 2013, Tessanne Chin performed the song on Season 5 of NBC's singing competition, The Voice for the Live Top 10 round.

See also
 Billboard Year-End Hot 100 singles of 1971
 List of number-one R&B singles of 1971 (U.S.)

References

External links
 [ Song review] on AllMusic
 Song review on Songfacts
 List of cover versions of "If I Were Your Woman" at SecondHandSongs.com
 

1970 singles
1971 singles
Gladys Knight & the Pips songs
Stephanie Mills songs
Nancy Wilson (jazz singer) songs
Alicia Keys songs
Motown singles
Songs written by Pam Sawyer
1970 songs
Songs written by Gloria Jones